The  is the archive of the city of Kobe in Japan. It contains records dating back to the mid 19th century. The building containing the archive is currently located in the Chuo district of Kobe, near Shin-Kobe Station.   The building is in Art Deco style, and was recognised as a "significant building" in 2000.

Archived items

Archived items include:
 English language newspapers:
 The Hiogo and Osaka Herald (4 January 1868 to March 1870)
 The Hiogo News (23 April 1868 to 30 December 1887)
 The Kobe Chronicle (3 July 1897 to 31 December 1901)
 The Japan Chronicle (8 January 1902 to 26 December 1912)
 Japan Gazette Official Directory from 1868 to the early 20th Century
 Japanese Newspapers in the Archives include,
 Kobe Shinpo
 Kobe Nippo
 Kobe Shimbun
 Asahi Shimbun Hyogo Edition
 Shinko Hyogo Shinbun
 Records from the Kobe foreign settlement and court records from that period (in both English and Japanese)

References 

Buildings and structures in Kobe
City archives
Archives in Japan
Art Deco architecture in Japan
Buildings and structures completed in 1938
1938 establishments in Japan